Golif is an Austrian Vienna-based artist. He is a representative of Austrian street and urban art.

Works  
"The Observer", his most elaborate work so far can be found in Vienna. It's a ground piece implemented in 2016, covering an area the size of approximately six football fields. Golif used 5 tons of paint in the making. While on the scene only black and white areas of varying sizes appear, the sheer vastness of the piece renders it fully perceivable only from the sky.

A large scale evolution of his iconised figures can be found in a 2.500 m2 wall painting on an Agricultural storage unit in Korneuburg, Lower Austria. In 2017 Golif crafted two tall towering characters onto two sides of the concrete tower, built in the 70ies, characterizing the area of the surrounding landscape. In contrast to “The Observer” these figures are animated by their steadfastness and vivid colouring. Four weeks of labour and at least 1.5 tons of paint went into creating this piece. It can be seen from A22 highway.

Two further interventions with the public space can be found framing the Wiener Gürtel. In 2019 Golif created two murals, each covering 327 m2. Located on the edges of the 15. and 17. district the now colourful and eye-catching house walls interrupt the densely built on concrete masses of the area. Through their prominent placement the pieces are visible to all participants of the street- and city life.

Other notable Projects
 Anschützgasse, Vienna, 2015
 Rochusmarkt, Vienna, 2018
 Sonnenallee-Hermannplatz, Berlin, 2018
 Naschmarkt, Vienna, 2018
 Hörtnagelstrasse, Tyrol, 2019
 Aspern, Vienna, 2020
 Ottilie-Bondy-Promenade, Vienna, 2020
 Illustrations for the November issue of santementale.fr, 2020
 Breitenfurther Straße, Vienna, 2021.The object received the architecture award „gebaut 2021“
 “The giant of Santre” hotel project, Brixen, 2022

Selected exhibitions 
 2014 Solo Exhibition, KMG Art Gallery/Vienna
 2015 Solo Exhibition, Tojner Collection/Vienna
 2015 Skulpturengarten Summerstage with Hans Kupelwieser/Vienna
 2015 Young Art Auction by Sothebys in the Albertina/Vienna
 2016 Goldenes Quartier/Vienna
 2016 "Golif Observed", Solo Exhibition, KMG Art Gallery/Vienna
 2017 Group Exhibition, E/AB Fair, The Tunnel/New York
 2017 Creau Advent. Tag der Abschaffung der Sklaverei/Vienna
 2018 Solo Exhibition, Galerie LeContainer/Nice
 2018 "Street Dreams" Group Exhibition, Le Docks Village/Marseille
 2018 Group Exhibition, Galerie LeContainer/St. Tropez
 2018 "GOLIF", Loos Haus/Vienna
 2018 Luxembourg Art Fair/Luxembourg
 2018 St. Art/Strasbourg
 2018 YIA Art Fair/Paris
 2019 Antibes Art Fair/Antibes
 2019 "GOLIF", KMG Art Gallery/Vienna
 2019 "Take Over", Group Exhibition Wien Museum/Vienna
 2019 "Golif Solo Show", Galerie LeContainer/Nice
 2019 St. Art/Strasbourg
 2020 Installation at Thiem's Seven tennis tournament/Kitzbühel
 2021: "SOLO Show", Take a Butcher's Gallery/Düsseldorf
 2021: "In Situ", Galerie LeContainer /Aix-en-Provence
 2022: "Finding Forte", Group Exhibition, designforum Wien/Vienna

References

External links 
 

Austrian artists
Year of birth missing (living people)
Living people